Lehigh Mountain is a mountain in Lehigh County, Pennsylvania. Lehigh Mountain is located on the right bank of the Lehigh River, and is separated from South Mountain by the headwaters of Trout Creek. It is part of the Reading Prong of the Appalachian Mountains.

References 

Mountains of Lehigh County, Pennsylvania